Visitors is a 2003 Australian psychological horror film directed by Richard Franklin (his final film), produced by Jennifer Hadden, and starring Radha Mitchell, Susannah York and Ray Barrett.

Premise
The film deals with the feelings of a young woman sailing solo on a yacht around the world. The loneliness makes her start losing her sanity.

Cast
Radha Mitchell as Georgia Perry
Dominic Purcell as Luke
Tottie Goldsmith as Casey
Susannah York as Carolyn Perry
Ray Barrett as Bill Perry
Che Timmins as Kai
Christopher Kirby as Rob
Phil Ceberano as Pirate Captain

Production
Richard Franklin says he wanted to make a thriller along the lines of Patrick.

Reception

Box office
Visitors grossed $34,270 at the box office in Australia.

Critical response
JR Southall of Starburst called the acting "terrific".

See also
Cinema of Australia

References

External links

2003 horror films
Australian horror thriller films
Films directed by Richard Franklin (director)
2000s horror thriller films
Films scored by Nerida Tyson-Chew
2000s English-language films